Yang Prasat Halt is a defunct railway station on the Suphanburi Line, located in Amphoe Ban Pong, Ratchaburi Province, Thailand. The station is on the west side of the track, together with Don Khun Wiset. The platform is 200 metres in length and has only one track.

Yang Prasat was changed from a railway station to a halt on January 1, 1977. Although the station ruins remain, no trains stop here.

References

External links
 Yang Prasat Halt Railway Station 

Defunct railway stations in Thailand
Railway stations closed in 1977